Anna Karima, née Todora Velkova (1871–1949), was a Bulgarian writer, translator, editor and journalist, suffragist and women's rights activist. She was co-founder of the Bulgarian Women's Union, and served as its chairperson from 1901 to 1906. 

She was the daughter of wheat trader Todor Velkov and worked as a teacher. In 1888, she married socialist Yanko Sakazov. She debuted and became known as a writer in 1891. In 1894, the family moved to Sofia, where she became active within social reform. In 1897, she founded the society Suznanie ("Conscience") and started to campaign for women's education, one of which was to have the University of Sofia open to women. From 1899, she edited the paper Zhenski glas ("Female voice") with Julia Malinova, and in 1901, they co-founded the Bulgarian Women's Union with Karima as its first chairperson. The organization was an umbrella organization of the 27 local women's organisations that had been established in Bulgaria since 1878. It was founded as a reply to the limitations of women's education and access to university studies in the 1890s, with the goal to further women's intellectual development and participation, arranged national congresses and used Zhenski glas as its organ. In 1906, she left the Bulgarian Women's Union. She founded the rival women's organization Ravnopravie  ("Equal rights", 1908-1921) and toured the country lecturing on women's rights reform. In 1918, she opened the first day care center for working mothers in Bulgaria. She was exiled for political reasons from 1921 to 1928.

References
 Francisca de Haan, Krasimira Daskalova & Anna Loutfi: Biographical Dictionary of Women's Movements and Feminisms in Central, Easterna and South Eastern Europe, 19th and 20th centuries Central European University Press, 2006
 Blanca Rodriguez Ruiz & Ruth Rubio-Marín: The Struggle for Female Suffrage in Europe: Voting to Become Citizens 2012

1871 births
1949 deaths
Bulgarian women's rights activists
Bulgarian feminists
19th-century Bulgarian people
Bulgarian suffragists
19th-century Bulgarian women